Kulić is South Slavic surname. Notable people with the surname include:

Dinka Kulić
Slavko Kulić (born 1941), Croatian scientist and economist concerned with the sociology of international relations
Zoran Kulić (born 1975), Serbian former football midfielder

See also
Kulic (surname)
Kulič (surname)
Kulich (surname)

Croatian surnames
Serbian surnames